Antonio Campo Dall'Orto is the former CEO of the Italian television broadcasting Rai.

Career
Dall'Orto was CEO of the Italian television broadcasting Rai from December 2015 to June 2017.

References

Italian chief executives
Living people
Year of birth missing (living people)
Place of birth missing (living people)